Morgaro Lima Gomis (born 14 July 1985) is a Senegalese professional footballer who last played as a defensive midfielder for Kelantan United.

Starting his career in France, Gomis spent most of his early career in English non-League football before moving to Scottish Football League side Cowdenbeath. His performances earned him a move to Dundee United in January 2007, where he exceeded expectations and was young player of the year for 2007–08. He was part of the Dundee United side that won the Scottish Cup in 2010 and was the first African to have played 100 times for the club. He left the club when his contract expired at the end of the 2010–11 season to join Football League Championship side Birmingham City. Gomis left Birmingham City in July 2013, having made 43 appearances for the club. He then rejoined Dundee United for a season before signing for Hearts in 2014. In 2016, he was loaned to Motherwell and made 10 appearances for the club before joining Kelantan in July 2016. After spending time with Omani club Sur SC in 2018, he returned to Scotland in January 2019 for a third spell with Dundee United, and joined Falkirk for the 2019–20 season. Following his release from Falkirk in May 2021 he signed for fellow Scottish League One club Clyde.

Although born in Paris and self-identifying as French, Gomis represented Senegal at international level, for whom he qualified through his Senegalese parents.

Career

Early career
Gomis was at Montpellier in his youth and had unsuccessful trials with Chelsea, Freiburg and Lausanne-Sport.

England
Gomis spent several years playing in English non-League football. In 2004, he signed for Windsor & Eton and featured in 18 league matches, scoring once. In January 2005, Gomis moved to Dagenham & Redbridge but the move quickly became controversial after an agent became involved in a contract row with the club. Gomis left in March 2005 without making an appearance and rejoined Windsor, playing in five matches before the end of the season. Gomis had a short stay with Barnet at the start of the 2005–06 season – where he featured in a matchday squad once as an unused substitute – but his month-to-month contract was not renewed and he moved to Lewes. He made his league debut in a 5–2 defeat of Weston-super-Mare on 15 Octoberthe club website's match report suggested that manager Steve King "may well have unearthed another little gem in Morgaro Gomis, whose contribution after arriving on the field as a 55th minute substitute was key to the eventual success."and played in fourteen Conference South matches, scoring once, during the season.

Cowdenbeath
In July 2006, Gomis moved to Scotland and joined Cowdenbeath who at the time were managed by Mixu Paatelainen. While at the Central Park club, Gomis scored twice: he "floated home a delightful shot from 20 yards high into the visitors' net" in a 4–2 win against Peterhead and a stoppage-time header to secure a 3–2 win at home to Forfar Athletic.

Dundee United

On 8 December, just four months after his Cowdenbeath debut, Gomis agreed a move to Scottish Premier League side Dundee United and joined in January 2007, signing until the end of the following season. Such was Gomis's earlier-than-expected impact – manager Craig Levein had said upon signing him that he would not go straight into the first team – that he was given a two-year extension to his contract in September 2007. In January 2009, Gomis received a further extension to his contract. Gomis received the first winner's medal of his senior career as a member of the Dundee United squad that won the 2010 Scottish Cup Final against Ross County.

In April 2011, manager Peter Houston indicated that he expected Gomis to leave at the end of the season because the club was unable to match the player's demands.

Birmingham City
On 16 June 2011, Championship club Birmingham City completed the signing of free agent Gomis on a two-year deal. He made his debut in the Football League on the opening day of the 2011–12 season, playing the whole of a 2–1 defeat at Derby County. At home to Millwall, Gomis, described by the Telegraphs reporter as "combin[ing] industry with silky passes from his deep-lying central midfield position", played a "deliciously weighted pass" behind the defence from which Jean Beausejour crossed for Chris Wood to open the scoring.

In May 2013, Birmingham confirmed that they were not going to take up their option to extend Gomis' contract, so he was to leave the club at the end of the season when his existing deal expired.

Return to Dundee United
After training with the club for several weeks, Gomis rejoined Dundee United on 10 October 2013; he signed a contract until the end of the 2013–14 season. He made his first appearance on 26 October, in a 4–0 victory against St Mirren. On 12 April 2014, he came on as a substitute in the Scottish Cup semifinal at Ibrox as United defeated Rangers 3–1, progressing to the final, in which he was an unused substitute as Dundee United lost 2-0 to St Johnstone. With John Rankin and Paul Paton an established pairing in midfield, Gomis struggled for game time. He made only five starts and sixteen substitute appearances in all competitions, and was among nine players to be released by the club when their contracts expired at the end of the season.

Heart of Midlothian
On 12 June 2014, Gomis signed for Heart of Midlothian on a three-year contract. He was the first signing under the management of Robbie Neilson, as well as the first signing since Hearts came out of administration. On 30 November, he was sent off in the eighth minute of Hearts' Scottish Cup fourth-round match at home to Celtic for a two-footed challenge on Scott Brown; Hearts lost the match 4–0.

In February 2016, Gomis moved on loan to fellow Scottish Premiership club Motherwell until the end of the season.

Kelantan
On 11 July 2016, Gomis signed for Kelantan on a one-year contract, becoming the second signing of Kelantan for second transfer window under the new head coach, Velizar Popov.

On 3 December 2017, Gomis extended his contract with Kelantan for another year.

Third spell at Dundee United
Gomis spent time with Sur SC of the Oman Professional League in 2018 before returning to Scotland where he trained with Dundee United. On 11 January 2019, he signed for his third spell with the club, saying that he "[was looking] forward to playing in front of the United fans again." Towards the end of his first league appearance of the new spell, a 1–0 defeat to Ayr United, he was sent off for a second yellow card. Gomis was released by United on 6 May, before the play-offs.

Falkirk
On 18 June 2019, Gomis signed for Falkirk on a one-year contract.

Clyde
On 27 May 2021, Gomis signed for Scottish League One side Clyde. On 23 December 2022, Gomis left the club by mutual consent.

International career
In March 2009, Gomis received his first international call-up, being named in Senegal's squad for friendly matches against Oman and Iran. Having been born in France of Senegalese parents, Gomis had always considered himself to be French, but was reportedly "flattered and surprised" by the call-up. Having initially said he would consider carefully whether to accept, he later announced his decision to play for Senegal. He made his debut that week in the starting eleven against Oman, a 2–0 defeat, and played as a substitute in the 1–1 draw with Iran.

Career statistics

HonoursLewesSussex Senior Challenge Cup: 2005–06Dundee UnitedScottish Cup: 2010Heart of Midlothian'
Scottish Championship: 2014–15

References

External links

1985 births
Living people
People from Le Blanc-Mesnil
Footballers from Seine-Saint-Denis
French footballers
Senegalese footballers
Senegal international footballers
Association football midfielders
Montpellier HSC players
Windsor & Eton F.C. players
Dagenham & Redbridge F.C. players
Barnet F.C. players
Lewes F.C. players
Cowdenbeath F.C. players
Dundee United F.C. players
Birmingham City F.C. players
Heart of Midlothian F.C. players
Motherwell F.C. players
Sur SC players
Kelantan FA players
Falkirk F.C. players
Clyde F.C. players
Kelantan United F.C. players
Isthmian League players
National League (English football) players
Scottish Football League players
Scottish Premier League players
English Football League players
Malaysia Super League players
Scottish Professional Football League players
Citizens of Senegal through descent
French sportspeople of Senegalese descent
Expatriate footballers in England
Expatriate footballers in Scotland
Expatriate footballers in Malaysia
Expatriate footballers in Oman
Senegalese expatriate sportspeople in England
Senegalese expatriate sportspeople in Scotland
Senegalese expatriate sportspeople in Malaysia
Senegalese expatriate sportspeople in Oman